Kevin Fletcher (born January 11, 1980) is an American-born Macedonian former professional basketball player.

References

External links
Euroleague.net Profile
FIBA.com Profile

1980 births
Living people
American emigrants to North Macedonia
American expatriate basketball people in Greece
American expatriate basketball people in Italy
American expatriate basketball people in Poland
American expatriate basketball people in Portugal
American expatriate basketball people in Russia
American expatriate basketball people in Turkey
American men's basketball players
Aris B.C. players
Astoria Bydgoszcz players
Basketball players from Denver
BC Krasny Oktyabr players
BC Enisey players
Beşiktaş men's basketball players
Centers (basketball)
Macedonian men's basketball players
Power forwards (basketball)
UCCS Mountain Lions men's basketball players